Energy in Somaliland refers to the production, storage, import, export, and consumption of energy in Somaliland, and is regulated by the Ministry of Energy and Minerals. 
Local biomass resources and imported petroleum are the two man principal sources of energy sector in Somaliland, the electricity prices across the country is considered one of the highest in the world, while the consumption is among the lowest in Sub-saharan Africa, as operated mostly by private sector. As of 2020, Over 20 IPPs were operating in Somaliland.

Between 2015 and 2021 Mott MacDonald completed installation of 1.9 MW of solar energy and connected it to the Somaliland grid. The effort was part of the £20 million Energy Security and Resource Efficiency in Somaliland (ESRES) program and was funded by the Government of the United Kingdom.

See also
Economy of Somaliland
Ministry of Energy and Minerals
Politics of Somaliland

References

External links